The plain xenops (Xenops minutus) is a passerine bird which breeds in moist lowland forests in the tropical New World from southern Mexico south to western  Ecuador, northeastern Argentina and central Brazil.

Description
The plain xenops is typically 12 cm long, weighs 12 g, and has a stubby wedge-shaped bill. The head is light brown with a buff supercilium and whitish malar stripe. The upperparts are brown, becoming rufous on the tail and rump, and there is a buff bar on the darker brown wings. The underparts are unstreaked pale olive brown. The sexes are similar, but young birds have dark brown throats. The lack of streaking is an obvious distinction from other xenops especially streaked xenops. It is also the only lowland species in the genus.

Behaviour
The plain xenops is often difficult to see as it forages for insects, including the larvae of wood-boring beetles, on bark, rotting stumps or bare twigs. It moves in all directions on the trunk like a treecreeper, but does not use its tail as a prop. It may be located by its sharp cheet call, or its song, a series of 5 or 6 trilled fit fit fit f’ f’f f’ notes. It regularly joins mixed-species feeding flocks.

Breeding
The plain xenops is a member of the South American bird family Furnariidae, a group in which many species build elaborate clay nests, giving rise to the English name for the family of "ovenbirds". However, it simply places shredded plant fibres in a hole between 1.5 and 9 m high in a decaying tree trunk or branch. The normal clutch is two white eggs, incubated by both sexes. This species is a resident breeder in forest habitats.

References

 Hilty,  Birds of Venezuela, 
 Stiles and Skutch,  A guide to the birds of Costa Rica

Further reading

plain xenops
Birds of Central America
Birds of Colombia
Birds of Venezuela
Birds of Ecuador
Birds of the Guianas
Birds of Trinidad and Tobago
Birds of the Amazon Basin
Birds of Brazil
plain xenops